Luíza Touché de Almeida (June 3, 1985 in Rio de Janeiro) is a Brazilian actress.

Personal life 

She was married to actor and director José Roberto Jardim; member of the theater group "Os Fofos Encenam" of São Paulo.

Career

TV

Cinema

References

External links 

1985 births
Living people
Actresses from Rio de Janeiro (city)
Brazilian television actresses
Brazilian telenovela actresses
Brazilian film actresses